Riccardo Cocuzza (born 27 January 1993) is an Italian footballer who plays for A.C. Legnano.

Biography
Born in Vizzolo Predabissi, the Province of Milan, Lombardy, Cocuzza started his career at F.C. Internazionale Milano. He was the member of the youth teams from 2002 until January 2010. Cocuzza scored 5 goals for Inter U-17 team in the first half of 2009–10 season, which he scored 4 goals in a single game against Pavia.

Parma
In January 2010 he was signed by fellow Serie A club Parma F.C., which Cocuzza was a member of the under-17 team in the first season.

Cocuzza was a member of the reserve team from 2010–11 season to January 2013, which he had a cruciate ligament injury in 2011–12 season. On 1 February 2013 Cocuzza was farmed to Gubbio. In 2013–14 season the loan was extended, which Cocuzza played for Gubbio in the first pre-season friendly along with other former Parma team-mate.

On 31 January 2014 Cocuzza and Mohamed Traoré left for South Tyrol, with Andrea Molinelli moved to Gubbio.

On 8 July 2014 he was farmed to Renate.

References

External links
 AIC profile (data by football.it) 
 

Italian footballers
Inter Milan players
Parma Calcio 1913 players
A.S. Gubbio 1910 players
F.C. Südtirol players
A.C. Renate players
Savona F.B.C. players
Alma Juventus Fano 1906 players
A.C. Legnano players
Serie C players
Serie D players
Association football forwards
Sportspeople from the Metropolitan City of Milan
Footballers from Lombardy
1993 births
Living people